Highlands School is a comprehensive school in Grange Park, Enfield, London, England. The school opened in 2000 in new purpose-built accommodation. From September 2006 the school has been full with pupils from Years 7 - 13 including a large sixth form.

Houses
Highlands School has four houses, Willow, Beech, Oak and Rowan. The students wear a green uniform with a green tie with a stripe of the colour of their house on it. Beech is blue, Willow is green, Rowan is red and Oak is purple.

International Baccalaureate
It has been an International Baccalaureate World School since December 2004, and sixth form students may take the International Baccalaureate Diploma (IB) instead of A-level examinations. Since the sixth form opened in September 2005, the first year of IB students took their exams in 2007, and 55% failed. Seven students were disqualified for alleged malpractice. Bruce Goddard, the headteacher at the time, was quoted as saying, "In some cases we are currently lodging appeals against this." The school has since decided to drop the IB and switch to A-levels.

BTEC
Highlands also offers a variety of BTEC courses, all of which are fully coursework (both practical and written) and include BTEC Media and Business Studies. Unlike the IB, Highlands has decided to continue this course.

OFSTED
Highlands has received two OFSTED Outstanding Ratings: One in 2011 and one in 2014.

Results

References

External links
Department for Education and Skills
International Baccalaureate
Highlands Ward profile

Secondary schools in the London Borough of Enfield
Educational institutions established in 2000
2000 establishments in England
Community schools in the London Borough of Enfield
Enfield, London